Jakob Wilhelm Sprengtporten (9 October 1794 – 29 September 1875) was a Swedish statesman and Lord of the Realm. He served as governor of Stockholm between 1830 and 1838 and as member of the Riksdag of the Estates between 1823 and 1866.

Jakob Wilhelm Sprengtporten was born, into the Sprengtporten family, at Sparreholm Castle in Södermanland, Sweden, the son of Johan Vilhelm Sprengtporten and the Countess Sophia Lovisa Mörner af Morlanda. He attended Uppsala University.

In 1825, Sprengtporten married Countess Ulrika Wilhelmina Brahe.

References 

1794 births
1875 deaths
Members of the Royal Swedish Academy of Sciences
Members of the Royal Swedish Academy of Arts
Barons of Sweden
Swedish generals
Uppsala University alumni
19th-century Swedish landowners
Jakob Wilhelm